Khammam district is a district in the eastern region of the Indian state of Telangana. The city of Khammam is the district headquarters. The district shares boundaries with Suryapet, Mahabubabad, Bhadradri districts and with Eluru and NTR districts in  Andhra pradesh state.

History 

Paleolithic man probably roamed around the areas of lower Godavari valley and the surroundings of Bhadrachalam, Kothagudem, Wyra, Sathupally and Paloncha Taluks in the district. Prehistoric rock paintings were found near Neeladri konda near Lankapalli of Sathupally Taluk.

Megalithic Dolmens were found at Janampet of Pinapaka Taluk.
Megalithic site on the campus of Government Degree college in Khammam has yielded pottery and skeletal remains. Kistapuram and Padugonigudem villages in Gundala Taluk of the district were rich in Megalithic cultural remnants explored and discovered recently.

The southern parts of Khammam district flourished as famous Buddhist centers along with Amaravathi and Vijayapuri along the rivulets Munneru, Wyra and Murredu. Important Buddhist sites in the district are Nelakondapalli, Mudigonda, Aswaraopeta and Karukonda near Kothagudem.

Post Independence 
Khammam town which was the seat of Taluk Administration was a part of the larger Warangal district, till 1 October 1953. Six taluks of the Warangal district viz., Khammam, Madhira, Yellandu, Paloncha, Kothagudem and Burgampadu were carved out as a new district with Khammam as headquarters. On 1 November 1956, Hyderabad state was dissolved, and Khammam district became part of Andhra Pradesh.

In 1959, Bhadrachalam revenue division consisting of Bhadrachalam and Nuguru Venkatapuram Taluks of East Godavari district, which were on the other side of the river Godavari were merged into Khammam on grounds of geographical contiguity and administrative viability. Aswaraopeta was also part of West Godavari District up to 1959. In 1973 a new taluk with Sathupalli as headquarters was carved out from Madhira and Kothagudem taluks. In the year 1976 three new taluks were formed viz., Tirumalayapalem, Aswaraopeta and Manuguru by bifurcating Khammam, Kothagudem and Burgampadu taluks respectively. In the year 1985, following the introduction of the mandal system, the district has been divided into 46 mandals, under four Revenue Divisions – Khammam, Kothagudem, Paloncha and Bhadrachalam.

On 2 June 2014, Khammam together with nine other districts became the new state of Telangana, which was separated from Andhra Pradesh. On 11 July 2014, the Lok Sabha approved a bill transferring seven mandals of Khammam district (Kukunoor, Velairpadu, Bhurgampadu, Chintoor, Kunavaram, Vararamachandrapuram and Bhadrachalam) back to Andhra Pradesh, in order to facilitate the Polavaram Irrigation project.

Geography 

Demographics 
 Census of India, the district has a population of 1,389,566.

Administrative divisions 
The district has two revenue divisions of Kallur and Khammam. These are sub-divided into 21 mandals. Rv Karnan is the present collector of the district.

Mandals 

The mandals of Chinturu, Kunavaram, Nellipaka and Vararamachandrapuram were added to East Godavari district based on Polavaram ordinance.

The list of 21 mandals in Khammam district under 2 revenue divisions are listed in the following table:

Economy 

In 2006 the Indian government named Khammam one of the country's 250 most backward districts (out of a total of 640). It is one of the districts in Telangana currently receiving funds from the Backward Regions Grant Fund Programme (BRGF).

Notable personalities 

The former Chief Minister of Andhra Pradesh(United), Jalagam Vengala Rao is from Khammam District. He served as 5th chief minister during 1973–78.
Thummala Nageshwar Rao, minister for Roads and buildings, women and child welfare in Telangana State Government is from this region. He also occupied several ministerial portfolios in United Andhra Pradesh.
Renuka Choudary, is an Indian politician and a member of the Indian National Congress, She has also served as the Union minister of State (Independent Charge) for Ministry of Women and Child Development and Tourism in UnitedAndhra Pradesh in the Government of India.
Nama Nageswara Rao served as Member of Parliament for 16th Lok Sabha of India. He is a businessman and owner of Madhucon Projects.At present 2020 he is the minister of khammam district(TRS Party).
Babu Mohan, notable actor and comedian in the Telugu film industry. He also served as Social Welfare Minister in TDP Government.
Vandemataram Srinivas is a South Indian music director, actor and singer.
K.Dasaradh is a Telugu film Writer, Director. He is well known for his movies Santosham (2002 film) and Mr. Perfect (film).
Srinivasa Reddy, notable actor and comedian in the Telugu film industry.

References

External links 

 Official website

 
1953 establishments in India
Khammam task force articles
Coal mining districts in India
Districts of Telangana